The Bowling Eldridge House, also known as Ridgecrest, is a historic plantation house located near Lynchburg, Bedford County, Virginia. It was built between 1822 and 1828, and is a two-story, five bay dwelling of mortise-and-tenon frame construction.  It has a gable roof with metal sheathing, exterior gable-end brick chimneys, a brick foundation, and beaded weatherboard siding. There is also an integral or earlier two-story ell with an exterior gable-end brick chimney and a pent room. The interior and exterior features Federal style details.

It was listed on the National Register of Historic Places in 1993.  The house was originally listed in Halifax County, Virginia.

References

Plantation houses in Virginia
Houses on the National Register of Historic Places in Virginia
Federal architecture in Virginia
Houses completed in 1828
Houses in Bedford County, Virginia
National Register of Historic Places in Bedford County, Virginia
1828 establishments in Virginia